The 1932 Milan–San Remo was the 25th edition of the Milan–San Remo cycle race and was held on 20 March 1932. The race started in Milan and finished in San Remo. The race was won by Alfredo Bovet.

General classification

References

1932
1932 in road cycling
1932 in Italian sport
March 1932 sports events